Derek Scott Allen (born January 30, 1971) is a former American football guard who played for the New York Giants of the National Football League in 1995. He also played for the Rhein Fire of the World League of American Football (today NFL Europe) in 1996. He played college football at the University of Illinois.<ref></ref

References 

1971 births
Living people
American football offensive guards
Illinois Fighting Illini football players
New York Giants players